Isobutanol (IUPAC nomenclature: 2-methylpropan-1-ol) is an organic compound with the formula (CH3)2CHCH2OH (sometimes represented as i-BuOH). This colorless, flammable liquid with a characteristic smell is mainly used as a solvent either directly or as its esters. Its isomers are 1-butanol, 2-butanol, and tert-butanol, all of which are important industrially.

Production
Isobutanol is produced by the carbonylation of propylene.  Two methods are practiced industrially, hydroformylation is more common and generates a mixture of isobutyraldehyde and butyraldehyde:
CH3CH=CH2  +  CO  +  H2  →   CH3CH2CH2CHO
The reaction is catalyzed by cobalt or rhodium complexes.  The resulting aldehydes are hydrogenated to the alcohols, which are then separated.  In Reppe carbonylation, the same products are obtained, but the hydrogenation is effected by the water-gas shift reaction.

Laboratory synthesis
Propanol and methanol can be reacted to produce isobutyl alcohol via Guerbet condensation.

Biosynthesis of isobutanol

E. coli as well as several other organisms has been genetically modified to produce C4 alcohols from glucose, including isobutanol, 1-butanol, 2-methyl-1-butanol, 3-methyl-1-butanol, and 2-phenylethanol. The host's highly active amino acid biosynthetic pathway is shifted to alcohol production. α-Ketoisovalerate, derived from valine, is prone to decarboxylation to give isobutyraldehyde, which is susceptible to reduction to the alcohol:
(CH3)2CHC(O)CO2H  →  (CH3)2CHCHO  +  CO2
(CH3)2CHCHO  +  NADH  +  H+  →  (CH3)2CHCH2OH  +  NAD+

Applications
The uses of isobutanol and n-butanol are similar.  They are often used interchangeably.  The main applications are as varnishes and precursors to esters, which are useful solvents, e.g. isobutyl acetate.  Isobutyl esters of phthalic, adipic, and related dicarboxylic acids are common plasticizers.  Isobutanol is also a component of some biofuels.

Safety and regulation

In March 2009, the Government of Canada announced a ban on isobutanol use in cosmetics.

References

External links

 
 
 
 

Alcohol solvents
Primary alcohols
GABAA receptor positive allosteric modulators
Sedatives
Hypnotics
Alkanols